This is a chronological list of notable cases decided by the Supreme Court of Canada from the appointment of Richard Wagner as Chief Justice of Canada in 2017 to the present.

2018 - present

See also 
 List of notable Canadian Courts of Appeals cases

 (2000-present)